Next of Kin is a 1989 American action thriller film directed by John Irvin and starring Patrick Swayze and Liam Neeson, with Adam Baldwin, Helen Hunt, Bill Paxton and Ben Stiller in one of his earliest roles. The screenplay was based on a story of the same title, both written by Michael Jenning.

Plot
Truman Gates, a former US Army Airborne Ranger raised in Appalachia, migrates to Chicago to become a police officer. Married to Jessie, who is pregnant, he has made the transition from hillbilly to respectable lawman.

When the coal mine closes, Truman persuades his younger brother Gerald to get work in Chicago. Unfortunately, soon after landing a job as a truck driver, his vehicle is hijacked by mobsters and Gerald is killed by Joey Rosellini, the nephew of mob boss Papa John Isabella.

Truman returns to Kentucky for the funeral. His surviving brother, Briar Gates insists on a traditional mountain blood feud, but Truman begs them to let Gerald's murder be dealt with by the law. Briar finds Truman's reluctance to be disgraceful. So, determined to deal with the murderers himself, Briar searches for his kid brother's killer in Chicago.

Meanwhile, Truman tries to solve the crime before Briar can take revenge. Approaching John Isabella, he explains the mountain code. He suggests Gerald's murderer surrenders peacefully to save them both a lot of trouble. John, however, refuses on general principle, and Truman is left to continue his investigation.

After arriving in town, Briar gets a room at a flop house. He gives the front desk clerk his cousin's number back home, asking him to call it if he doesn't return by morning.

Briar immediately goes looking for information on the man who killed Gerald, shooting up a local mob hangout in the process. Truman arrives a little later, Joey, embarrassed by the attack, says he is not pressing charges against Briar, intending to "handle things" himself. When Papa John says things are getting out of hand, Joey dismisses the threat, saying that the Gates family, "plow rocks for a living." John responds, "That's what they said about 'our' people back in Sicily."

Working together for a time, Briar and Truman discover who the hijackers were from a witness. Truman pressures Lawrence, the son of Papa John, to turn state's evidence against Joey. When Lawrence goes to Joey for help, he betrays him.  Lawrence's body is found, having been tortured, with Briar's shotgun at the scene.

Joey goes to Papa John who, devastated, sanctions a hit on the supposed culprit.  Before he can, Briar breaks into Rosellini's trucking company and engages in a gunfight with Joey's crew and kills two of them before Joey shoots Briar twice. Fatally wounded, Briar dies in Truman's arms.

When the flop house desk clerk hears about the deaths at the Trucking Company on the news, he calls the number Briar gave him.

Even though both Truman and the police know that the evidence against Briar was planted, and that Briar's death was an ambush, there is no proof. Truman resigns from the police force to go after the Rosellini mob himself. As the Gates family gathers together and travels to Chicago to begin a war against the Outfit, Truman goes on the offensive and throws one of Joey's guys through the window of a restaurant. When Joey comes out, he finds "You forgot one," painted on Joey's car, and he vows to kill Truman without Papa John's permission.

Truman lures the Rosellini crew to a darkened cemetery, where an extended battle ensues, including the arrival of the Gates clan (and their hound dogs and rattlesnakes). In the end, Truman has Joey pinned on the ground with a knife to his throat only to be stopped when Papa John arrives with members of the Gates family held at gunpoint. He orders Truman to drop the knife and move out of the way. Having learned the truth about Lawrence's murder, to Joey's horror, he points the gun not at Truman, but at him. The Don tells Joey, "This is for killing my son," and he fatally shoots Joey.

The Gates and Isabella families call a truce. Back at the police station, Truman finds Jessie and tells her, "You're my family."

Cast
 Patrick Swayze as Detective Truman Gates
 Liam Neeson as Briar Gates
 Adam Baldwin as Joey Rosselini
 Helen Hunt as Jessie Gates
 Bill Paxton as Gerald Gates
 Don James as David Jenkins
 Ben Stiller as Lawrence Isabella
 Andreas Katsulas as Johnny "Papa John" Isabella
 Michael J. Pollard as Harold
 Joseph R. Ryan as Grandpa Gates
 Rodney Hatfield as Hollis Gates
 Brett Hadley as De Witt Gates
 Richard Wharton as Selkirk Gates
 Kelly Blair as Tolbert Gates
 Charles Williams as Pierce
 Michael Wise as "Snakeman"
 Ted Levine as Willy Simpson
 Del Close as Frank
 Valentino Cimo as "Rhino"
 Paul Greco as Leo
 Vincent Guastaferro as Paulie
 Paul Herman as Lieutenant Tony Antonelli
 Starla Fugate as Woman Pouring Coffee
 Sally Murphy as Hooker
 Lisa Niemi as The Violinist (uncredited)

Production

Filming
Some of the home scenes and the opening scenes were filmed in the small Perry County, Kentucky coal camp of Hardburly. Others were done at the M.C. Napier High School gym in Hazard, Kentucky and in Letcher County near Carbon Glow.

Reception 
Next of Kin received mixed reviews from critics, scoring 50% on Rotten Tomatoes, based on 10 reviews. Critic Brian Orndorf wrote, "Next of Kin isn't a dazzling picture, but there's personality about it that eases the blow of idiocy, keeping the adventure of Truman Gates, redneck cop, alive and well." It earned a Razzie Award nomination for Patrick Swayze as Worst Actor (also for Road House), where he lost to William Shatner for Star Trek V: The Final Frontier. In Sweden it was retitled Dirty Fighting (in English) to capitalize on Swayze's earlier success with Dirty Dancing. The film has since become a cult classic.

Film critics Siskel & Ebert, in particular, were not impressed with the film including it on their Worst of 1989 show. Roger Ebert described the scene where the women are preparing lunch for the men getting ready for combat as "desperation time at the old screenwriting factory". Gene Siskel mocked the bow and arrow fight at the climax, suggesting that it might have had more impact had it been shot in the daytime instead of night.

Soundtrack 
A soundtrack to the film was also released through Columbia Records. Here is the track listing:

"Brother to Brother" - Gregg Allman & Lori Yates - 3:58
"Hey, Backwoods" - Rodney Crowell - 4:11
"Hillbilly Heart" - Ricky Van Shelton - 2:56
"Straight and Narrow" - Ricky Skaggs - 2:51
"Paralyzed" - Sweethearts of the Rodeo - 3:00
"The Yard Sale" - Billy Lawson - 2:24
"My Sweet Baby's Gone" - Charlie Daniels - 3:15
"Pyramid of Cans" - George Jones - 2:31
"Brothers" - Patrick Swayze & Larry Gatlin - 4:10
"Wailing Sax" - Duane Eddy - 3:19

References

External links

 
 
 
 
 

1989 films
1989 action thriller films
1989 independent films
American action thriller films
American independent films
Country music films
Films scored by Jack Nitzsche
Films about brothers
Films about the Chicago Outfit
American films about revenge
Films directed by John Irvin
Films produced by Jeb Stuart
Films set in Appalachia
Films set in Chicago
Films set in Kentucky
Films shot in Chicago
Films shot in Kentucky
American police detective films
Warner Bros. films
1980s English-language films
1980s American films